The 2012 Kent State Golden Flashes baseball team represented Kent State University in the 2012 NCAA Division I baseball season.  The Golden Flashes were coached by 8th year head coach Scott Stricklin and played their home games at Schoonover Stadium.  Kent State finished the regular season 37–17 overall and 24–3 in the Mid-American Conference (MAC) to win the MAC regular-season and East division titles, and the top seed in the 2012 Mid-American Conference baseball tournament. At the tournament, Kent State went 4–0 to win the tenth Mid-American Conference baseball tournament title in program history and advance to the 2012 NCAA Division I baseball tournament, the 12th appearance in team history.

In the NCAA tournament, the team went 3–0 in the Gary Regional at U.S. Steel Yard to claim the program's first regional championship, which included a 21-inning, 7–6 win over 12th-ranked Kentucky. The Flashes advanced to the Super Regional round against the 10th-ranked  where they defeated the Ducks two games to one at PK Park to claim the first super regional championship and appearance in the College World Series in school history. At the 2012 College World Series the Golden Flashes fell to Arkansas in the opening round, but eliminated top-ranked Florida 5–4 in the elimination bracket. Kent State was eliminated in the second round by South Carolina. Kent State finished 1–2 at the College World Series, and 6–3 in the NCAA tournament.

The season featured a 21-game winning streak, which began with a 16–5 home win over Western Michigan on April 27, and ended with a 3–2 road loss to Oregon in the second game of the super regional series in Eugene, Oregon. Kent State finished the season with an overall record of 47–20 and tied for 5th nationally by virtue of their second-round elimination in the College World Series. They finished the season ranked in the top ten in all major polls.

Roster

Schedule

! style="" | Regular Season
|- valign="top" 

|- bgcolor="#ccffcc"
| 1 || February 17 || #9 Georgia Tech || Winthrop Ballpark • Rock Hill, SC || 5–0 || 1–0 || 
|- align="center" bgcolor="#ffbbb"
| 2 || February 18 || #9 Georgia Tech || Winthrop Ballpark • Rock Hill, SC || 2–6 || 1–1 || 
|- bgcolor="#ccffcc"
| 3 || February 18 || Winthrop || Winthrop Ballpark • Rock Hill, SC || 11–3 || 2–1 || 
|- align="center" bgcolor="#ffbbb"
| 4 || February 24 || Lipscomb || Dugan Field • Nashville, TN || 1–2 || 2–2 || 
|- bgcolor="#ccffcc"
| 5 || February 25 || Lipscomb || Dugan Field • Nashville, TN || 16–3 || 3–2 || 
|- bgcolor="#ccffcc"
| 6 || February 26 || Lipscomb || Dugan Field • Nashville, TN || 4–0 || 4–2 || 
|-

|- align="center" bgcolor="#ffbbb"
| 7 || March 3 || Western Kentucky || Nick Denes Field • Bowling Green, KY || 2–5 || 4–3 || 
|- bgcolor="#ccffcc"
| 8 || March 4 || Western Kentucky || Nick Denes Field • Bowling Green, KY || 13–3 || 5–3 ||
|- align="center" bgcolor="#ffbbb"
| 9 || March 5 || Western Kentucky || Nick Denes Field • Bowling Green, KY || 1–2 || 5–4 ||
|- bgcolor="#ccffcc"
| 10 || March 9 || New Mexico State || Presley Askew Field • Las Cruces, NM || 7–4 || 6–4 ||
|- bgcolor="#ccffcc"
| 11 || March 10 || New Mexico State || Presley Askew Field • Las Cruces, NM || 10–9 || 7–4 ||
|- align="center" bgcolor="#ffbbb"
| 12 || March 11 || New Mexico State || Presley Askew Field • Las Cruces, NM || 6–12 || 7–5 ||
|- align="center" bgcolor="#ffbbb"
| 13 || March 12 || New Mexico State || Presley Askew Field • Las Cruces, NM || 4–14 || 7–6 ||
|- bgcolor="#ccffcc"
| 14 || March 16 || Pepperdine || Eddy D. Field Stadium • Malibu, CA || 2–0 || 8–6 ||
|- align="center" bgcolor="#ffbbb"
| 15 || March 18 || Pepperdine || Eddy D. Field Stadium • Malibu, CA || 4–10 || 8–7 ||
|- align="center" bgcolor="#ffbbb"
| 16 || March 19 || Pepperdine || Eddy D. Field Stadium • Malibu, CA || 4–6 || 8–8 ||
|- align="center" bgcolor="#ffbbb"
| 17 || March 20 || Fresno State || Pete Beiden Field • Fresno, CA || 2–14 || 8–9 ||
|- align="center" bgcolor="#ffbbb"
| 18 || March 21 || Fresno State || Pete Beiden Field • Fresno, CA || 2–5 || 8–10 ||
|- bgcolor="#ccffcc"
| 19 || March 23 || Northern Illinois || Schoonover Stadium • Kent, OH || 12–6 || 9–10 || 1–0
|- bgcolor="#ccffcc"
| 20 || March 24 || Northern Illinois || Schoonover Stadium • Kent, OH || 6–1 || 10–10 || 2–0
|- bgcolor="#ccffcc"
| 21 || March 25 || Northern Illinois || Schoonover Stadium • Kent, OH || 5–3 || 11–10 || 3–0
|- align="center" bgcolor="#ffbbb"
| 22 || March 27 || Toledo || Schoonover Stadium • Kent, OH || 3–4  || 11–11 || 3–0
|- align="center" bgcolor="#ffbbb"
| 23 || March 28 || Pittsburgh || Cost Field • Pittsburgh, PA || 5–6 || 11–12 || 3–0
|- bgcolor="#ccffcc"
| 24 || March 30 || Ball State || Ball Diamond • Muncie, IN || 7–4  || 12–12 || 4–0
|- bgcolor="#ccffcc"
| 25 || March 31 || Ball State || Ball Diamond • Muncie, IN || 4–2  || 13–12 || 5–0
|-

|- bgcolor="#ccffcc"
| 26 || April 1 || Ball State || Ball Diamond • Muncie, IN || 18–2 || 14–12 || 6–0
|- align="center" bgcolor="#ffbbb"
| 27 || April 3 || Penn State || Schoonover Stadium • Kent, OH || 7–9 || 14–13 || 6–0
|- bgcolor="#ccffcc"
| 28 || April 4 || Toledo || Schoonover Stadium • Kent, OH || 8–4 || 15–13 || 6–0
|- bgcolor="#ccffcc"
| 29 || April 6 || Buffalo || Schoonover Stadium • Kent, OH || 5–4 || 16–13 || 7–0
|- bgcolor="#ccffcc"
| 30 || April 7 || Buffalo || Schoonover Stadium • Kent, OH || 6–3 || 17–13 || 8–0
|- bgcolor="#ccffcc"
| 31 || April 8 || Buffalo || Schoonover Stadium • Kent, OH || 6–3 || 18–13 || 9–0
|- bgcolor="#ccffcc"
| 32 || April 11 || Youngstown State || Schoonover Stadium • Kent, OH || 14–4 || 19–13 || 9–0
|- align="center" bgcolor="#ffbbb"
| 33 || April 13 || Bowling Green || Steller Field • Bowling Green, OH || 5–6 || 19–14 || 9–1
|- align="center" bgcolor="#ffbbb"
| 34 || April 14 || Bowling Green || Steller Field • Bowling Green, OH || 6–9 || 19–15 || 9–2
|- bgcolor="#ccffcc"
| 35 || April 15 || Bowling Green || Steller Field • Bowling Green, OH || 31–20 || 20–15 || 10–2
|- bgcolor="#ccffcc"
| 36 || April 17 || Pittsburgh || Schoonover Stadium • Kent, OH || 6–5 || 21–15 || 10–2
|- align="center" bgcolor="#ffbbb"
| 37 || April 20 || Central Michigan || Theunissen Stadium • Mt. Pleasant, MI || 0–3 || 21–16 || 10–3
|- bgcolor="#ccffcc"
| 38 || April 21 || Central Michigan || Theunissen Stadium • Mt. Pleasant, MI || 6–3 || 22–16 || 11–3
|- bgcolor="#ccffcc"
| 39 || April 22 || Central Michigan || Theunissen Stadium • Mt. Pleasant, MI || 6–4 || 23–16 || 12–3
|- bgcolor="#ccffcc"
| 40 || April 24 || Niagara || Schoonover Stadium • Kent, OH || 8–4 || 24–16 || 12–3
|- align="center" bgcolor="#ffbbb"
| 41 || April 25 || Penn State || Medlar Field • University Park, PA || 4–6 || 24–17 || 12–3
|- bgcolor="#ccffcc"
| 42 || April 27 || Western Michigan || Schoonover Stadium • Kent, OH || 16–5 || 25–17 || 13–3
|- bgcolor="#ccffcc"
| 43 || April 28 || Western Michigan || Schoonover Stadium • Kent, OH || 4–0 || 26–17 || 14–3
|- bgcolor="#ccffcc"
| 44 || April 29 || Western Michigan || Schoonover Stadium • Kent, OH || 7–1 || 27–17 || 15–3
|-

|- bgcolor="#ccffcc"
| 45 || May 4 || Ohio || Bob Wren Stadium • Athens, OH || 4–1 || 28–17 || 16–3
|- bgcolor="#ccffcc"
| 46 || May 5 || Ohio || Bob Wren Stadium • Athens, OH || 8–1 || 29–17 || 17–3
|- bgcolor="#ccffcc"
| 47 || May 6 || Ohio || Bob Wren Stadium • Athens, OH || 13–4 || 30–17 || 18–3
|- bgcolor="#ccffcc"
| 48 || May 11 || Miami || Schoonover Stadium • Kent, OH || 3–0 || 31–17 || 19–3
|- bgcolor="#ccffcc"
| 49 || May 12 || Miami || Schoonover Stadium • Kent, OH || 7–6 || 32–17 || 20–3
|- bgcolor="#ccffcc"
| 50 || May 13 || Miami || Schoonover Stadium • Kent, OH || 10–4 || 33–17 || 21–3
|- bgcolor="#ccffcc"
| 51 || May 15 || Eastern Michigan || All Pro Freight Stadium • Avon, OH || 8–7 || 34–17 || 21–3
|- bgcolor="#ccffcc"
| 52 || May 17 || Akron || Canal Park • Akron, OH || 6–1 || 35–17 || 22–3
|- bgcolor="#ccffcc"
| 53 || May 18 || Akron || Schoonover Stadium • Kent, OH || 15–2 || 36–17 || 23–3
|- bgcolor="#ccffcc"
| 54 || May 19 || Akron || Schoonover Stadium • Kent, OH || 2–1 || 37–17 || 24–3
|-

|-
! style="" | Post-Season
|- 

|- bgcolor="#ccffcc"
| 55 || May 23 || (8) Buffalo || All Pro Freight Stadium • Avon, OH || 9–0 || 38–17 || 1–0
|- bgcolor="#ccffcc"
| 56 || May 24 || (4)  || All Pro Freight Stadium • Avon, OH || 12–3 || 39–17 || 2–0
|- bgcolor="#ccffcc"
| 57 || May 25 || (8) Buffalo || All Pro Freight Stadium • Avon, OH || 8–3 || 40–17 || 3–0
|- bgcolor="#ccffcc"
| 58 || May 26 || (3)   || All Pro Freight Stadium • Avon, OH || 3–1 || 41–17 || 4–0
|-

|- bgcolor="#ccffcc"
| 59 || June 1 || (2) Kentucky || U.S. Steel Yard • Gary, IN || 7–6  || 42–17 || 1–0
|- bgcolor="#ccffcc"
| 60 || June 2 || (1) Purdue || U.S. Steel Yard • Gary, IN || 7–3 || 43–17 || 2–0
|- bgcolor="#ccffcc"
| 61 || June 3 || (2) Kentucky || U.S. Steel Yard • Gary, IN || 3–2 || 44–17 || 3–0
|-

|- bgcolor="#ccffcc"
| 62 || June 9 || #5  || PK Park • Eugene, OR || 7–6 || 45–17 || 4–0
|- bgcolor="#ffbbb"
| 63 || June 10 || #5 Oregon || PK Park • Eugene, OR || 2–3 || 45–18 || 4–1
|- bgcolor="#ccffcc"
| 64 || June 11 || #5 Oregon || PK Park • Eugene, OR || 3–2 || 46–18 || 5–1
|-

|- bgcolor="#ffbbb"
| 65 || June 16 || Arkansas || TD Ameritrade Park • Omaha, NE || 1–8 || 46–19 || 0–1
|- bgcolor="#ccffcc"
| 66 || June 18 || Florida || TD Ameritrade Park • Omaha, NE || 5–4 || 47–19 || 1–1
|- bgcolor="#ffbbb"
| 67 || June 21 || South Carolina || TD Ameritrade Park • Omaha, NE || 1–4 || 47–20 || 1–2
|-

Rankings

References

Kent State Golden Flashes baseball seasons
Kent State Golden Flashes
College World Series seasons
Mid-American Conference baseball champion seasons
Kent State Golden Flashes base
Kent State